Madeleine Egle (born 21 August 1998) is an Austrian luger. She won bronze at the 2016 Winter Youth Olympics and in 2018 another bronze medal at the 2018 Olympics in Pyeongchang.

Career

Egle turned pro in 2015 at the age of 16. She debuted at the FIL World Luge Championships during the 2015 FIL World Luge Championships. A year later she won her first career medal in the 2016 Winter Youth Olympics in Lillehammer, Norway.

She made her Olympics debut at the 2018 Winter Olympics in PyeongChang, South Korea. Egle won a bronze medal during the team relay event.

See also
List of Olympic medalists in luge
Luge at the 2018 Winter Olympics

References

External links

Madeleine Egle profile at Eurosport

1998 births
Living people
Lugers at the 2018 Winter Olympics
Lugers at the 2022 Winter Olympics
Olympic lugers of Austria
Austrian female lugers
Medalists at the 2018 Winter Olympics
Medalists at the 2022 Winter Olympics
Olympic silver medalists for Austria
Olympic bronze medalists for Austria
Olympic medalists in luge
People from Innsbruck-Land District
Lugers at the 2016 Winter Youth Olympics
Sportspeople from Tyrol (state)
21st-century Austrian women